1995–96 was the 34th season in the history of SD Compostela, and their second in La Liga.

Season summary

Compostela began their second season in the top flight by searching for a new manager, as Fernando Castro Santos, who had been with the club since their Tercera División days, left to join fellow Galician club Celta Vigo. He was replaced by Lugo manager Fernando Vázquez, who led Compos to the best league result in their history in his first season: they finished the season in a highly respectable 10th place. They also reached the last 16 of the Copa del Rey before being beaten 3–1 on aggregate by Sevilla, which was also their best performance in that competition up to that point. They would eventually better in by reaching the quarter-finals in 1999–2000.

Squad

Left club during season

Squad stats
Last updated on 10 March 2021.

|-
|colspan="14"|Players who have left the club after the start of the season:

|}

La Liga

See also
SD Compostela
1995–96 La Liga
1995–96 Copa del Rey

References

SD Compostela seasons
Compostela